Barry Bryant (born 4 May 1940) is a former Australian rules footballer who played for the Carlton Football Club in the Victorian Football League (VFL).

Notes

External links 

Barry Bryant's profile at Blueseum

1940 births
Carlton Football Club players
Living people
Australian rules footballers from Victoria (Australia)